Spyros Depountis (1918 – 2004) was a Greek footballer. He played in two matches for the Greece national football team from 1936 to 1938. He was also part of Greece's team for their qualification matches for the 1938 FIFA World Cup.

References

External links
 

1918 births
2004 deaths
Greece international footballers
Place of birth missing
Association football forwards
Footballers from Athens
Greek footballers
Olympiacos F.C. players